Tremblant most commonly refers to:
 Mont-Tremblant, a city in Quebec, Canada
 Mont Tremblant Resort, a ski resort in Quebec, Canada

Tremblant, Mont-Tremblant, or Mont Tremblant may also refer to:

Places 
 Mont-Tremblant National Park, a provincial park in Quebec, Canada
 Lac-Tremblant-Nord, a small village in Quebec, Canada
 Urban agglomeration of Mont-Tremblant, metropolitan regional government and area

Geographical features 
 Mont Tremblant, a mountain in the Laurentian Mountains
 Lake Tremblant, a lake in Quebec, Canada

Sports 
 Circuit Mont-Tremblant, a road racing course in Mont-Tremblant, Quebec, Canada
 Mont Tremblant (horse), a racehorse

See also 
 Mont-Tremblant Airport (disambiguation)